The 1891 Swarthmore Quakers football team was an American football team that represented Swarthmore College a member of the Pennsylvania Intercollegiate Football Association (PIFA) during the 1891 college football season. The team compiled a 9–2 record and outscored opponents by a total of 302 to 94. Jacob K. Shell was the head coach.

Schedule

References

Swarthmore
Swarthmore Garnet Tide football seasons
Swarthmore Quakers football